The Shalva Band is an Israeli band consisting of eight disabled musicians. The group was formed in 2005 at the SHALVA organization, which supports and empowers individuals with disabilities and their families in Israel. The band has performed on several occasions in Israel and around the world, including conferences, cultural events, and in ceremonies at the official residence of the President of Israel.

The band has cooperated with leading musicians from Israel, including Shlomi Shabat, Avraham Fried, Moshe Peretz, Eyal Golan, David Broza, Idan Amedi, Shiri Maimon, Yonatan Razel, and Natan Goshen. Internationally famous singers and actors, including Demi Lovato and Jamie Foxx, have praised the band.

The band reached the final stages of qualification, but later learned that they would be required to disobey Shabbat observance during rehearsals for Eurovision. The band was then invited to perform as the interval act of the second semi-final of the Eurovision Song Contest 2019 – without violating the beliefs of any member of the band – with a cover of "A Million Dreams". A few days before performing at Eurovision, the band also performed at the torch-lighting ceremony that opens the celebrations of the Israeli Independence Day.

The band has gone on international tours including performances to North and South America and Europe. Their American debut was for the Israeli American Council, where they performed for President Donald Trump and summit attendees. They performed at Eton College's interfaith concert in 2018.

Shalva Band's first official music video is a mash-up of Matisyahu's "One Day" and "Let It Go" from Frozen, along with a few other pop songs.

References

External links 
 

Israeli musical groups
Eurovision Song Contest 2019
Israeli people with disabilities